Patrick Dennis Duddy is an American diplomat, formerly United States Ambassador to Venezuela. He served from August 6, 2007 to September 11, 2008, during the Bush Administration, was expelled by Venezuelan President Hugo Chavez, and eight months later was returned as Ambassador by the Obama Administration. He replaced William Brownfield, who also was the subject of repeated threats of expulsion from Chavez before leaving to become ambassador to Colombia.

Duddy served for just over a year before being expelled by Chavez, who claimed to have uncovered an American-led plot to overthrow him.  The action took place after, and partially as a result of, a dispute between the United States and Bolivian president Evo Morales; Chavez expressed support for Morales.  The embassy was run by John Caulfield as Chargé d'Affaires in the interim. In March 2008 Duddy had requested funding from the US government "to influence the information environment within Venezuela".

He returned in July 2009 when the Obama Administration restored diplomatic relations with Venezuela. He finished his assignment in July 2010. President Obama nominated Larry Palmer as his replacement. However the Senate did not confirm him and  Hugo Chavez refused to accept him as ambassador, leaving the position vacant. Duddy currently serves as a diplomat in residence at Duke University's Center for International Studies. Duddy attended undergraduate at Colby College, graduating in 1972.

References

External links
Biography from the United States Department of State

Ambassadors of the United States to Venezuela
People from Bangor, Maine
Colby College alumni
Living people
Year of birth missing (living people)
Northeastern University alumni